This is a list of notable individuals who have publicly expressed reservations about nuclear power, nuclear weapons, and/or nuclear waste disposal in Germany. Many of these people have received the Nuclear-Free Future Award.

Karl Bechert
Hermann Behmel
Hildegard Breiner
Rolf Disch
Hans-Peter Dürr
Hans-Josef Fell
Erich Fromm
Siegwart Horst Günther
Robert Jungk
André Larivière
Irene Meichsner
Rainer Moormann
Claudia Roth
Rüdiger Sagel
Hermann Scheer
Jens Scheer
Gerhard Schröder
Inge Schmitz-Feuerhake
Michael Sladek
Ursula Sladek
Klaus Traube
Roland Vogt
Armin Weiss

See also

Anti-WAAhnsinns Festival
Black bloc 
Brokdorf
Bund für Umwelt und Naturschutz Deutschland
Free Republic of Wendland
Nuclear power phase-out
Nuclear reprocessing plant Wackersdorf
Renewable energy commercialization
Renewable energy in Germany
List of Nuclear-Free Future Award recipients
List of books about nuclear issues
List of Chernobyl-related articles
List of nuclear whistleblowers
Lists of nuclear disasters and radioactive incidents

References

Advocates
 Germany
Lists of German people
Environment-related lists
Green thinkers